Liew Daren (born 6 August 1987) is a Malaysian badminton player. His biggest success to date is having won the 2012 French Open Super Series. He reached a career high ranking of World No.10. He also represented Malaysia competed at the 2010 Guangzhou Asian Games and 2014 Glasgow Commonwealth Games.

Early life 
Liew was born in Kuala Lumpur, Malaysia and was educated at the Taman Midah Primary School. He began playing badminton at the age of seven. His brother was once a national badminton player. Liew started to play badminton professionally in 1998.

Career 
During the 2012 Thomas Cup quarter-final, he was defeated by Lin Dan from China, but not before he brought it into a rubber game of 21–17, 9–21 and 5–21. His best performance was during the Yonex French Open, where he won his first Super Series title on 28 October 2012 after beating Viktor Axelsen from Denmark with the scores of 21–18 and 21–17.

The 2014 Thomas Cup finals saw Liew facing off against Takuma Ueda from Japan in a gripping battle to break the tie between Malaysia and Japan, who were even at 2–2 as they entered the decisive third Men's Singles match. Liew lost to Ueda after the match went into a rubber game, scoring 21–12, 18–21 and 21–17.

Achievements

BWF World Championships 
Men's singles

BWF Superseries 
The BWF Superseries, launched on 14 December 2006 and implemented in 2007, is a series of elite badminton tournaments, sanctioned by Badminton World Federation (BWF). BWF Superseries has two level such as Superseries and Superseries Premier. A season of Superseries features twelve tournaments around the world, which introduced since 2011, with successful players invited to the Superseries Finals held at the year end.

Men's singles

  BWF Superseries Finals tournament
  BWF Superseries Premier tournament
  BWF Superseries tournament

BWF Grand Prix 
The BWF Grand Prix has two levels, Grand Prix and Grand Prix Gold. It is a series of badminton tournaments, sanctioned by the Badminton World Federation (BWF) since 2007.

Men's singles

  BWF Grand Prix Gold tournament
  BWF Grand Prix tournament

BWF International Challenge/Series 
Men's singles

  BWF International Challenge tournament
  BWF International Series tournament

References

External links 
 Profile at Badminton Association of Malaysia

1987 births
Living people
Sportspeople from Kuala Lumpur
Malaysian sportspeople of Chinese descent
Malaysian male badminton players
Badminton players at the 2014 Commonwealth Games
Commonwealth Games gold medallists for Malaysia
Commonwealth Games medallists in badminton
Badminton players at the 2010 Asian Games
Badminton players at the 2018 Asian Games
Asian Games competitors for Malaysia
Competitors at the 2009 Southeast Asian Games
Competitors at the 2011 Southeast Asian Games
Southeast Asian Games silver medalists for Malaysia
Southeast Asian Games medalists in badminton
21st-century Malaysian people
Medallists at the 2014 Commonwealth Games